Aysel Manafova (born 1990) is an Azerbaijani model and beauty pageant titleholder who was crowned Miss Azerbaijan in 2012. She represented her country at Miss Universe 2013 on 9 November 2013 in Moscow, Russia.

Early life
Aysel works as a model in Baku.

Miss Azerbaijan 2012
Aysel was crowned as the New Miss Azerbaijan 2012 in Baku. In 2013, she was appointed to represent Azerbaijan at the Miss Universe 2013 pageant where she failed to place in the Top 16. That was the first time Azerbaijan participated in the contest.

Personal life
She is deeply passionate about gymnastics, horseback riding, swimming and volunteering for various causes, like the Society for Stray Animals Protection.

References

External links
Official Miss Azerbaijan website

Living people
1990 births
Miss Universe 2013 contestants
Azerbaijani female models
Azerbaijani beauty pageant winners
People from Baku